The Yarra old grammarians Football Club is a not-for-profit sporting organisation competing in the Victorian Amateur Football Association (VAFA), Australia.

The club was formed in 1993 by a group of former students of Yarra Valley Grammar School.  The club was admitted to the VAFA that same year and, with Wayne Reddaway as senior coach and Jarrod Dickson as captain, commenced in the newly formed F2 Grade.

They won their first premiership in 1994 and have followed this success with additional senior, U19 and reserve premierships in 1999, 2002 and 2012.

References

Victorian Amateur Football Association clubs
Australian rules football clubs established in 1993
1920 establishments in Australia